Rubic Ghasemi-Nobakht (born 27 July 1987) is an Iranian former professional footballer who played as a striker.

Personal life
Rubic's elder brother Sebastian is also a footballer.

Career statistics

References

1987 births
Living people
German footballers
Iranian footballers
Hannover 96 II players
Hannover 96 players
FC Oberneuland players
Berliner AK 07 players
German people of Iranian descent
Sportspeople of Iranian descent
Oberliga (football) players
Regionalliga players
Bundesliga players
Place of birth missing (living people)
Association football forwards
Sportspeople from Göttingen